The women's javelin throw event at the 2015 Summer Universiade was held on 10 and 12 July at the Gwangju Universiade Main Stadium.

Medalists

Results

Qualification
Qualification: 59.00 m (Q) or at least 12 best (q) qualified for the final.

Final

References

Javelin
2015 in women's athletics
2015